The Agony of the Eagles (French: L'agonie des aigles) is a 1952 French historical drama film directed by Jean Alden-Delos and starring Roger Pigaut, Charles Moulin and Noël Roquevert. Two previous films of the story had been made a 1922 silent film and a 1933 sound film. The film's sets were designed by the art director Claude Bouxin.

Synopsis
Following Waterloo, Napoleon is defeated and in exile. Colonel de Montander, a veteran of the Napoleonic War, hatches a plot to restore the French Empire by placing the imprisoned, young Napoleon II on the throne.

Cast
   Roger Pigaut as Col. de Montander  
 Charles Moulin as Goglu 
 Noël Roquevert as Capt. Doguereau  
 Raymond Rognoni as Coutillo  
 Colette Pearl as Lise Dorian  
 Pierre Morin as Chambusque  
 Jean Mauvais as Le commandant Thiéry  
 Catherine Arley as La comtesse d'Ormesson  
 Gérald Castrix as Lt. Triaire 
 Robert Allan as Lt. Pascal de Breuilly  
 Léonce Corne as Constant  
 Henri Valbel as Le président du tribunal 
 Roger Vincent as Le docteur  
 Georges Bréhat 
 Paul Lalloz 
 Jean-Marc Lambert 
 Jean Berton 
 Maurice Dorléac 
 Lucien Bryonne 
 Jean-Pierre Lorrain

References

Bibliography 
 Klossner, Michael. The Europe of 1500-1815 on Film and Television: A Worldwide Filmography of Over 2550 Works, 1895 Through 2000. McFarland & Company, 2002.

External links 
 

1950s historical drama films
French historical drama films
1952 films
1950s French-language films
Films set in the 1820s
1950s French films
Films based on French novels